Miranda Kalefi (born 1963, in Kavajë) is an Albanian painter. She attended the Academy of Fine Arts in Ravenna, Italy where she has resided since 1994. Kalefi has participated in a number of group exhibitions in Ravenna and has collaborated with the Art Gallery of "Albero Celeste" of S.Giminiamo in Siena.

Exhibitions
Biografia Artistica

Movimento e Parole (Ravenna, 2003) Galleria Art Studio Ravenna

Apparizioni - Mostra collettiva (Ravenna, 2004)

19 marzo 2004 Mostra di pittura Galleria Art Studio, Ravenna

Oltre il viso ( presso la galleria del comune di Lugo, 2008)

Le Donne ...L’eterno Enigma (27 MARZO 2010) Palazzo Rasponi 

WE CAN DO IT RAVENNA, 07 GIUGNO 2013 Mostra fotografica (Mostra Personale)

Dal 2005 al 2017 ha  collaborato con Galleria Celeste a  San Gimignano 

Arte Paris 2019 - Premio Picasso 6/8 settembre Parigi 2019 Artetra Art Associates Salerno

Arte Firenze 24 ottobre-05 Nov 2019 premio Leonardo Da Vinci ArtetrA #artsharing#artcontest#

Esposizione Innsbruck 2019 ArtetrA / Art Associates Salerno

Esposizione Atene Arte Italia 2019 ArtetrA #artsharing #artcontest Art Associates Salerno 

Art & Investmement  Asta 2020  Galleria Ascoli - Piceno

New York  Art&Investmement 2020 ArtetrA #artsharing #artcontest Art Associates Salerno 

Dubai Digital Exhibition 19-10-2020 ArtetrA #artsharing #artcontest Art Associates Salerno 

28-31 OKT 2021 Innsbruck Digital Exhibition #artsharing #artcontest Prince Art Gallery

2021 Fiera  Scope  Beach / Miami Art & Investment / Digital exhibition - Prince Art Gallery

18 Dicembre 2021-  Premio IconArt Magazine - Milano Terza - Prince Art Gallery 

 26 marzo - 12 Aprile 2022 Preludio alla Biennale-Venezia.  A cura dott. Giorgio Gregorio Grasso

 4-10 APRILE 2022 - MOSTRA 1° Premio città di Berlino - Art Now - Von Zeidler Art Gallery

References

1963 births
Living people
Painters from Kavajë
Albanian painters
Albanian women painters